Disco Godfather (also known as The Avenging Disco Godfather) is a 1979 American action film starring Rudy Ray Moore and Carol Speed, directed by J. Robert Wagoner and released by Transvue Pictures. J. Robert Wagoner wrote and directed Disco Godfather while living in The Hotel Carver.

Commonly considered a blaxploitation film, the plot centers on Moore's character Tucker Williams, a retired cop who owns and operates a disco and tries to shut down the local angel dust (PCP) dealer after his nephew Bucky, (Julius Carry) gets "whacked out" on the drug. Another PCP user's claim to have served her own baby as Easter dinner constitutes a version of the urban legend known as "The Baby-Roast."

The Disco Godfather's trademark phrase is his encouragement of the disco patrons to "Put your weight on it, put your weight on it, put your weight on it!".

The film also served as the debut of Keith David, who has an unbilled bit part as a patron in the nightclub.

Cast
 Rudy Ray Moore as Tucker Williams
 Carol Speed as Noel
 Jimmy Lynch as "Sweetmeat"
 Jerry Jones as Dr. Fred Mathis
 Lady Reed as Mrs. Edwards
 Hawthorne James (as James H. Hawthorne) as Ray "Stinger Ray"
 Julius Carry (as Julius J. Carry III) as "Bucky"
 Hazel Spears as Ellen Davis
 Frank Finn as Lieutenant Frank Hayes
 Pucci Jhones as The Angel of Death

References

External links
 
 

1979 films
Blaxploitation films
1970s crime action films
1970s dance films
Disco films
American crime action films
1970s English-language films
1970s American films